Koce Efremov (born 17 March 1956) is a Yugoslav wrestler. He competed in the men's freestyle 52 kg at the 1980 Summer Olympics.

References

1956 births
Living people
Yugoslav male sport wrestlers
Olympic wrestlers of Yugoslavia
Wrestlers at the 1980 Summer Olympics
Place of birth missing (living people)